Daniel Knauf, sometimes credited under the pseudonyms Wilfred Schmidt and Chris Neal, is an American television screenwriter and producer, as well as comic book writer, best known for his creation of the 2003 HBO series Carnivàle.

Early Life
Born and raised in Los Angeles, Knauf attended several colleges in Southern California studying fine art, and later graduated from the California State University, Los Angeles with a bachelor's degree in English in 1982. He began work as an employee benefits consultant and later a health insurance broker, writing once he was able to support himself and his family financially.

Origins of Carnivàle
Hoping to become a screenwriter, Knauf's first draft of Carnivàle, written in 1992, was 180 pages long and twice the length of the average feature film. Convinced the screenplay could not work as either a standard television series or a film, he put it aside, planning to one day adapt it into a novel. Carnivàle evolved as a result of Knauf's childhood fascination with carnivals and his interest in "freaks", due in part to the childhood polio that confined his father to a wheelchair, which Knauf felt his father was defined by. After meeting with a number of television writers at a Writers Guild of America retreat in the mid-90s, he started to think that his screenplay might work as a television piece. He took the first act and reworked it as a television pilot, but shelved the script again when he could not get the project produced.

Career
Knauf went on to write the 1994 HBO-produced television movie Blind Justice, and, during a low-point in his screenwriting career, created his own website, posting his resume and Carnivàle's first act online. He created the 2001 television pilot Honey Vicarro and was a writer and consulting producer for the television series Wolf Lake. He was also writer and director on the 2002 film Dark Descent (his sole directing credit) before a television production scout brought Carnivàle to television producers Scott Winant and Howard Klein, who brought it to HBO where the series ended up being produced, twelve years after Knauf had first drafted the script.

Since Carnivàle was cancelled in 2005, Knauf has moved on to write for Supernatural and Standoff, also serving as a co-executive producer on Standoff. He worked as a writer for the Christian Slater drama My Own Worst Enemy in 2008.

He and his son Charles Knauf have written issues 7–18 and 21–28 of Iron Man for Marvel Comics, as well as volume #2 of The Eternals since its 2006 revival after over thirty years. He has submitted a draft to Sci Fi Channel for an adaptation of The Phantom.

He was a consulting producer for the latter part of the first season of historical action drama Spartacus: Blood and Sand. Knauf wrote two episodes for the first season. Knauf co-wrote with Andrea Berloff and Caleb Pinkett the script for a mystery thriller, The Legend of Cain, but it has not been produced.

Knauf was the writer and showrunner of the short-lived NBC series Dracula, before joining the staff of The Blacklist with the beginning of season two.

Filmography

Films

Television

References

External links

 

Television producers from California
American television writers
Film producers from California
American male screenwriters
American comics writers
Year of birth missing (living people)
Living people
American male television writers
Film directors from Los Angeles
Screenwriters from California